Ivar Frønes (born 2 August 1946 in Porsgrunn) is a Norwegian sociologist.

He graduated with a mag.art. degree (PhD equivalent) in 1975, and took the dr.philos. degree in 1995. He was hired at the University of Oslo in 1986 and is now professor.

Selected bibliography
De likeverdige - Om sosialisering og de jevnaldrendes betydning, 2006
Mellom to kulturer, with Katrine Fangen, 2006
Tegn tekst og samfunn, with Odd Are Berkaak, 2005
Annerledeslandet, 2005
Dialog, selv og samfunn, with Tone S. Wetlesen, 2004
Det norske samfunn, co-editor with Lise Kjølsrød, 2003
Digitale skiller, 2002
Handling, kultur og mening, 2001
På sporet av den nye tid, 2000
Among Peers, 1995

References
University of Oslo
List of publications in FRIDA

1946 births
Living people
Norwegian sociologists
Academic staff of the University of Oslo
People from Porsgrunn